The Daily Post (1719–1771) was a London daily paper begun on October 4, 1719 by printer in the Old Bailey, near Ludgate, with contributions from Daniel Defoe.  It was later printed by John Meres (a relation of Hugh Meres); Meres also became printer of the London Evening Post by 1737.

The Post consisted of articles that spoke of current events, important dates, inventions, advances in modern sciences, and other things of that nature.  It lasted until 1771.

References

External links

Publications established in 1719
1719 establishments in England